Slobodan Božović (born October 31, 1979) is a Serbian former professional basketball player.

References

External links
Balkanleague.net profile
Euroleague.net profile
FIBA.com profile

1979 births
Living people
Apollon Patras B.C. players
BK Iskra Svit players
KK Ergonom players
KK Mašinac players
KK Partizan players
KK Olimpija players
KK Sloga players
KK Smederevo players
KK Zemun players
BC Balkan Botevgrad players
MBK Handlová players
Serbian men's basketball players
Serbian expatriate basketball people in Bulgaria
Serbian expatriate basketball people in Cyprus
Serbian expatriate basketball people in Greece
Serbian expatriate basketball people in Iran
Serbian expatriate basketball people in Slovakia
Serbian expatriate basketball people in Slovenia
Serbian expatriate basketball people in North Macedonia
Centers (basketball)
Power forwards (basketball)